Francois is a local service district and designated place in the Canadian province of Newfoundland and Labrador. It is located on the southern coast of Newfoundland on François Bay at the end of a small fjord. There is a general store, a post office and a small museum, accessed by concrete pathways and boardwalks. Most residents pronounce the name "Fran-sway", and its proper spelling is without the cedilla found in the French word françois.

Francois is inaccessible by road and may be reached only by air or sea.

History 
The community was first settled in the 1700s, and resisted the government resettlement programs of the mid 20th century, though it reconsidered and rejected resettlement in 2013 and again in 2021.

Geography 
François is in Newfoundland within Subdivision E of Division No. 3. It is located on the southern coast of Newfoundland on François Bay at the end of a small fjord. The community is approximately 36 km east of the community of Grey River.

Demographics 

Government 
Francois is a local service district (LSD) that is governed by a committee responsible for the provision of certain services to the community. The chair of the LSD committee is Austin Fudge.

Transportation 
There is no road to the village, which can only be accessed by boat and helicopter, and snowmobile in the winter. Francois is serviced by an intra-provincial ferry in Burgeo.

See also 
List of communities in Newfoundland and Labrador
List of designated places in Newfoundland and Labrador
List of local service districts in Newfoundland and Labrador
Newfoundland outport

References 

Designated places in Newfoundland and Labrador
Local service districts in Newfoundland and Labrador
Road-inaccessible communities of Newfoundland and Labrador
Fishing communities in Canada
Car-free zones in Canada
Populated coastal places in Canada